Oluwale is both a surname and given name. Notable people with the name include:

David Oluwale (1930–1969), British Nigerian who drowned in Leeds having been assaulted by police officers
Oluwale Bamgbose (born 1987),  Nigerian-American mixed martial artist